Abner Nash Ogden (September 19, 1809 – August 11, 1875) was a justice of the Louisiana Supreme Court from May 4, 1853, to July, 1855.

Born in Hillsborough, North Carolina, Ogden's father was judge Robert Ogden and his maternal grandfather was North Carolina Governor Abner Nash. Following an amendment to the Louisiana Constitution allowing direct election of justices, Ogden was elected to serve as an associate justice of the Louisiana Supreme Court for a term beginning May 4, 1853, remaining in office until July 1855, and thereafter serving as the Court Reporter for that body until 1865.

Ogden declined a seat on the federal bench at one time, on the United States District Court for the District of Louisiana.

Ogden died in Blount Springs, Alabama.

References

Justices of the Louisiana Supreme Court
1809 births
1875 deaths
People from Hillsborough, North Carolina
19th-century American judges